Clive Harold Rush (February 14, 1931 – August 22, 1980) was an American football player and coach at both the professional and collegiate levels.  He served as the head football coach at Toledo University from 1960 to 1962.  Rush was the head coach of the Boston Patriots during the 1969 American Football League (AFL) season and the 1970 National Football League (NFL) season.

Career
Rush played college football at Miami University, then competed for one season in the National Football League (NFL) with the Green Bay Packers in 1953. From there, Rush received a strong coaching education, with collegiate stints at the University of Dayton (under Hugh Devore), Ohio State University (under Woody Hayes), and the University of Oklahoma (under Bud Wilkinson). In 1960, he accepted the head coaching position at the University of Toledo, but left after three losing seasons.

Rush then became an assistant with the New York Jets of the American Football League in 1963, serving as the main architect of the team's high-powered offense that was later led by Joe Namath. As offensive coordinator, he reached the high point of his career when he mapped the Jets' game plan as they upset the Baltimore Colts in Super Bowl III on January 12, 1969. That success resulted in his hiring by the Patriots 18 days later. Another finalist for the job was Colts secondary coach Chuck Noll, who was hired a few days later by the Pittsburgh Steelers.

His tenure with the Patriots was marked by constant conflict with players, owners, league officials and the media. One bizarre indication of Rush's luck came on February 12, 1969, when he introduced the team's new general manager, George Sauer, Sr. While grabbing the microphone, Rush received a five-second electrical shock that left him briefly stunned.

During his 21 games as Patriots' head coach, his team won only five contests. During the team's sixth straight loss of the 1970 NFL season, a 45–10 defeat to the Buffalo Bills on November 1, 1970, Rush began to suffer an irregular heartbeat and briefly left the stadium. Two days later, he resigned as head coach and said he would never coach again.

However, in March 1971, he was hired by George Allen, who had recently taken the helm of the Washington Redskins. Just six weeks later, Rush abruptly resigned and was out of football for the next five years.

Rush resurfaced as the head football coach at the United States Merchant Marine Academy in 1976. While he led the team to an 8–1 record, complaints from players resulted in his firing after only one season. Rush did not coach the final two games.

Never coaching again, Rush ran a car dealership in Springfield, Ohio. He suffered a sudden heart attack at his home in London, Ohio and later died at a local hospital. At the time of his death, Rush was a regional director for Grolier Education Corporation.

Head coaching record

College

* Rush did not coach the final two games but is credited with both wins.

See also
 List of American Football League players

References

External links
 
 

1931 births
1980 deaths
American football ends
Boston Patriots (AFL) coaches
Boston Patriots (AFL) head coaches
Boston Patriots coaches
Boston Patriots head coaches
Dayton Flyers football coaches
Green Bay Packers players
Merchant Marine Mariners football coaches
Miami RedHawks football players
New York Jets coaches
Ohio State Buckeyes football coaches
Washington Redskins coaches
People from Logan County, Ohio
People from London, Ohio
Players of American football from Ohio